The Roman Catholic Diocese of Livingstone is a diocese located in Livingstone in Zambia.

History
 May 25, 1936: Established as Apostolic Prefecture of Victoria Falls from the Apostolic Prefecture of Broken Hill
 March 10, 1950: Promoted as Apostolic Vicariate of Livingstone
 April 25, 1959: Promoted as Diocese of Livingstone

Leadership
 Prefect Apostolic of Victoria Falls (Roman rite) 
 Fr. Vincent Joseph Flynn, O.F.M. Cap. (1936.07.28 – 1950.03.10)
 Vicar Apostolic of Livingstone (Roman rite) 
 Bishop Timothy Phelim O'Shea, O.F.M. Cap. (1950.05.24 – 1959.04.25 see below)
 Bishops of Livingstone (Roman rite)
 Bishop Timothy Phelim O'Shea, O.F.M. Cap. (see above 1959.04.25 – 1974.11.18)
 Bishop Adrian Mung'andu (1974.11.18 – 1984.01.09), appointed Archbishop of Lusaka
 Bishop Raymond Mpezele (1985.05.03 - 2016.05.18)
 Bishop Valentine Kalumba, OMI (since 2016.06.18)

See also
Roman Catholicism in Zambia

Sources
 GCatholic.org
 Catholic Hierarchy

Roman Catholic dioceses in Zambia
Christian organizations established in 1936
Roman Catholic dioceses and prelatures established in the 20th century
Roman Catholic Ecclesiastical Province of Lusaka
Roman Catholic bishops of Livingstone